Ruslan Ismailovich Balbek (born 28 August 1977) is a Russian politician and former member of the State Duma from the United Russia party. A supporter of the annexation of Crimea by the Russian Federation, he has been highly critical of the Mejlis. 

Balbek grew up in Sudak, then part of the Ukrainian Soviet Socialist Republic in the Soviet Union, where his family lived after their return from exile. He began trying to enter local politics with the Socialist Party of Ukraine in 2010, but remained a junior figure. From 2007 to 2012 he was a delegate of the Qurultay. In 2014 he took on a more senior role in politics, being chosen for a position in the Council of Ministers of Crimea, replacing . Shortly after entering the Duma in 2016 he was sanctioned by Canada. The Prosecutor's office of Ukraine opened a case against him for treason, which he described as "nonsense", saying he never swore loyalty to the Euromaidan Government. As a member of the Duma he has denied that Moscow treats Crimean Tatars as second-class citizens, contradicting claims from Crimean Tatar opposition. 

Balbek has been criticized for making bold unsubstantiated claims, including saying Vatan Karabash's attempted self-immolation was a Hollywood production and that Hizb-ut-tahir is Anglo-saxon. His political opponents have described him as a "collaborator" and "careerist" enriching himself by supporting the administration in Crimea, and Mustafa Dzhemilev has accused him of being an FSB agent since 2006, pointing out his arrest for embezzlement in 2006, citing his release from the charges in 2006 and his release after arrest for assaulting a police officer in 2011.

References

1977 births
21st-century Russian politicians
Crimean Tatar politicians
Fugitives wanted by Ukraine
Living people
People of the annexation of Crimea by the Russian Federation
Seventh convocation members of the State Duma (Russian Federation)
Russian individuals subject to European Union sanctions